The 1777 New York gubernatorial election was held in June 1777 to elect the governor and the lieutenant governor.

History
The election began on June 1, but due to the American Revolution it took some time to collect and count the votes, and the official result was announced on July 9. George Clinton accepted the office of Governor on July 11 and assumed its duties immediately, pending to take the oath as soon as he could safely leave his military command. He took the oath of office on July 30.

There were no parties yet, as the Democratic-Republican and Federalist Parties appeared only in 1792. Until then the candidacies were based on personal recognition. The concepts of "running mates" also did not apply in this election, with candidates running separately for Governor and Lieutenant Governor. The New York Committee of Safety endorsed Philip Schuyler for Governor and George Clinton for Lieutenant Governor.

Candidates
Candidates for Governor included:
Brigadier General George Clinton
Major General Philip Schuyler
Brigadier General and member of the New York Provincial Congress John Morin Scott
Member of the New York Provincial Congress John Jay

Candidates for Lieutenant Governor included:
Brigadier General George Clinton
Member of the New York Provincial Congress Pierre Van Cortlandt
Colonel and member of the New York Provincial Congress Abraham Ten Broeck.

Result
George Clinton was elected both Governor and Lieutenant Governor. Clinton formally resigned the lieutenant governorship, leaving a vacancy. State Senator Pierre Van Cortlandt was elected President pro tempore of the State Senate, and acted as Lieutenant Governor until the end of the legislative year. Van Cortlandt was then elected in a special election and took office as Lieutenant Governor on June 30, 1778.

Notes

See also
New York gubernatorial elections

1777
United States gubernatorial elections in the 1770s
Gubernatorial